Wiking is the all-time leading sire of Arabian racehorses. Born in Poland in 1979, Wiking was imported to the United States in 1984. He raced 19 times and earned $97,782 in US dollars. He was owned by Town and Country Farms and trained by Robert Knight.

A bay stallion standing , Wiking sired 498 registered foals. He is in the Arabian Horse Trust Racing Hall of Fame, and was named the 1985 International Arabian Horse Association racehorse of the year.

He is the record holder in terms of the number of offspring that won in the United States.

Pedigree

Sources

1979 racehorse births
Arabian racehorses
Individual Arabian and part-Arabian horses